Mr. Sampath is a 1972 Indian Tamil-language satirical film directed by Cho, who also stars. It is based on the R. K. Narayan novel Mr. Sampath – The Printer of Malgudi (1949). The film features an ensemble cast led by Muthuraman, and has music composed by M. S. Viswanathan. It was released on 13 April 1972.

Plot 

Sampath, though poor by birth, has a heart of gold. Though clever and wise, he wants to become rich without hard work. He pretends to be rich, even a film producer. But ultimately, he realises that one cannot cheat people all the time.

Cast 
Adapted from Indian Films:
 Muthuraman
 Sundarrajan
 Cho as Sampath
 Vennira Aadai Moorthy
 Mali
 Poornam Viswanathan
 Neelu
 Jaya
 Manorama
 Sukumari

Production 
Mr. Sampath is based on the novel Mr. Sampath – The Printer of Malgudi by R. K. Narayan. The film adaptation was produced by A. Sunderam under Vivek Chitra Films, and filmed in black and white. Besides directing, Cho Ramaswamy also starred, and wrote the screenplay.

Soundtrack 
The music of the film was composed by M. S. Viswanathan, while the lyrics were written by Vaali.

References

External links 
 

1970s satirical films
1970s Tamil-language films
Adaptations of works by R. K. Narayan
Films based on Indian novels
Films directed by Cho Ramaswamy
Films scored by M. S. Viswanathan
Indian satirical films